Manuel Andreu Colomer was a Catalan politician and trade unionist.

He was a founding member of Solidaritat Obrera and its successor union, the CNT, in 1913 he was in charge of directing the union's newspaper Solidaridad Obrera. On 18 October 1914 he represented the CNT in the Assembly of Mataró and was imprisoned shortly afterwards. On 30 October 1915 he was elected as General Secretary of the CNT, a position that he occupied until August 1916. However, due to his Catalanist convictions, Duran eventually joined Acció Catalana Republicana and was elected to the Barcelona City Council in October 1936.

References

Anarchists from Catalonia
Catalan nationalists
Barcelona municipal councillors
Secretaries General of the Confederación Nacional del Trabajo
Year of birth unknown
Year of death unknown
Politicians from Catalonia